An apple cider cookie is a cookie that is prepared and flavored with apple cider. Some versions use apple cider in the cookie dough, while others have a glaze or icing prepared with apple cider. Some apple cider cookies use apple cider in both the cookie dough and glaze or icing. Typical ingredients include apple cider, flour, sugar or brown sugar, vegetable oil or butter, spices and baking soda. Additional ingredients may include apple butter, applesauce, chopped or dried apples, nuts and dates. Vegan varieties of the apple cider cookie exist.

See also
 List of cookies

References

Cookies
Cider cookie
Cider